The Joseph F. Loubat was a 19th-century Sandy Hook pilot boat built in 1880 at the Jacob S. Ellis shipyard in Tottenville, Staten Island. She was the largest of the pilot-boats in the Sandy Hook service. In 1896 she was one of the last pilot-boats that were sold in an age of steam and electricity.

Construction and service 

On Saturday, December 18, 1880, the Joseph F. Loubat was launched from the Jacob S. Ellis's shipyard in Tottenville, Staten Island. A large number of pilots and their families came to the shipyard to observe the launch of the new pilot-boat.

She was built by Jacob S. Ellis at an expense of $13,000, for co-ownership with Electus Comfort, W. J. Barry, James McCarthy, and Maurice J. Mariga. Her length was 88 feet, breadth of beam 21 feet, depth of hold is 9 feet and 150 tones. The name of the boat was chosen for Joseph Florimond Loubat, who was a yachtsman and author of one of the earliest American yachting memoir: A Yachtsman’s Scrap Book, or the Ups and Downs of Yacht Racing. Captain Electus Comfort was master of the boat. The Joseph F. Loubat was registered with the Record of American and Foreign Shipping from 1882-1888.

Boat accidents

On April 27, 1888, the Ward Line steamer Santiago, hit the Loubat, pilot-boat when she was at anchor at the Sandy Hook bar. Captain, Frank P. Van Pelt and other pilots were rescued from the boat.

Another accident occurred on January 1, 1894, when the Loubat, went ashore two miles east of the Amagansett Life Saving Station. The crew on the pilot-boat were saved by the men from the lifesaving station. The four pilots on board were C. J. Madigan, Thomas Shields, William Ferrie, and Frank P. Van Pelt.

Out of service
On February 1, 1896, the New York Pilots discarded the Loubat, along with fifteen other sailboats and moved them to the Erie Basin in Brooklyn. They were replaced with new up-to-date steam pilot-boats. The Joseph F. Loubat, was sold cheap for $4,000. Other pilot boats that were sold were the William H. Starbuck, Richard K. Fox, and the Edmund Blunt.

See also
List of Northeastern U. S. Pilot Boats

References 

Individual sailing vessels
Service vessels of the United States
1880 ships
Schooners of the United States
Pilot boats
Ships built in Staten Island